The 1999–2000 Liga Alef season saw Hapoel Majd al-Krum (champions of the North Division) and Maccabi Ashkelon (champions of the South Division) winning the title and promotion to Liga Artzit. At the end of the season, Liga Artzit clubs, Beitar Tel Aviv and Shimshon Tel Aviv merged to form Beitar Shimshon Tel Aviv, and Hapoel Nir Ramat HaSharon were also promoted.

At the bottom, Maccabi Afula (from North division) and Hapoel Or Yehuda (from South division) were all automatically relegated to Liga Bet, whilst Sektzia Nes Tziona were reprieved from relegation, after Maccabi Lazarus Holon folded at the end of the season.

North Division

 Hapoel Ashdod merged with Maccabi Ironi Ashdod to form F.C. Ashdod, leaving the division with 13 teams.

South Division

References

Israel 4th tier @ RSSF

Liga Alef seasons
4
Israel